The Mothership is an upcoming American science fiction adventure film written and directed by Matthew Charman. The film stars Halle Berry, Molly Parker, and Omari Hardwick.

The Mothership is scheduled to be released in 2023, by Netflix.

Plot
One year after her husband mysteriously vanishes from their rural farm, single mother Sara Morse and her children discover a strange, extraterrestrial object underneath their home, which leads them to embark on a race to find their husband, father, and most importantly – the truth.

Cast
 Halle Berry as Sara Morse
 Molly Parker
 Omari Hardwick
 Sydney Lemmon as Johanna
 Rafael Silva as Alex
 John Ortiz
 Paul Guilfoyle as Dr. Francis Singer

Production
Principal photography began on June 14, 2021 and concluded on August 9, 2021 in Boston, Massachusetts.

References

External links
 

Upcoming films
2023 films
American science fiction adventure films
English-language Netflix original films
Films about extraterrestrial life
Films about missing people
Films shot in Boston
Media Rights Capital films
Upcoming English-language films
Upcoming Netflix original films